Jacob Hoyle (born April 15, 1994) is an American épée fencer. He competed in the 2020 Summer Olympics.

Hoyle was born in New York City to Charlie and Suzie Hoyle, and is Jewish. He attended Strath Haven High School. He fenced in college for Columbia University ('16).

References

External links
 Columbia Lions bio

1994 births
Living people
21st-century American Jews
Jewish male épée fencers
Jewish American sportspeople
Sportspeople from New York City
Fencers at the 2020 Summer Olympics
American male épée fencers
Olympic fencers of the United States
Columbia Lions fencers